Orange Revolution is a 2007 feature-length documentary produced by York Zimmerman Inc. and directed by Steve York capturing the massive street protests that followed the rigged 2004 presidential elections in the Ukraine (a.k.a. the Orange Revolution).

Awards 
 2007 President's Award, Chicago International Documentary Film Festival
 2007 Bronze Plaque, Columbus International Film Festival
 2007 Proskar Award for Best Documentary, Seattle International Film Festival

Screenings and festivals
2009 Council on Foreign Relations, Washington, D.C.
2009 The Metta Center for Nonviolence, Berkeley, CA
2009 University of British Columbia, Canada "Cinema Politica: Screening Truth to Power" Series
2009 Cairo Human Rights Film Festival
2008 Portland Art Museum
2008 Harvard Law School
2007 The San Francisco International Film Festival
2007 DOCNZ Film Festival, New Zealand Asia Pacific Premiere
2007 Hot Docs: Canadian International Documentary Film Festival, Toronto Canadian Premiere
2007 Seattle International Film Festival
2007 AFI Fest, Los Angeles
2007 United Nations International Film Festival, Stanford University
2007 Chicago International Documentary Film Festival World Premiere

See also
Orange Winter

References

External links

Documentary films about elections
American documentary films
2007 films
Ukrainian-language films
2000s Russian-language films
2007 documentary films
Documentary films about Ukraine
Documentary films about revolutions
Orange Revolution
Films directed by Steve York
2000s English-language films
2000s American films